Clivina arunachalensis is a species of ground beetle in the subfamily Scaritinae. It was described by Saha & Biswas in 1985.

References

arunachalensis
Beetles described in 1985